Lyngdoh may refer to:

Ampareen Lyngdoh (born 1965), Indian politician, Member of the Legislative Assembly from Meghalaya, India
B. B. Lyngdoh (1922–2003), long-serving Chief Minister of Meghalaya, India
Banteidor Lyngdoh, People's Democratic Front politician from Meghalaya, India
Chesterpoul Lyngdoh, Indian professional footballer
Constantine Lyngdoh, Indian politician of the Hill State People's Democratic Party from Meghalaya, India
Eugeneson Lyngdoh (born 1986), Indian footballer
Hopingstone Lyngdoh (1929–2015), Indian politician, president of the Hill State People's Democratic Party (HSPDP)
James Michael Lyngdoh (born 1939), Indian civil servant, Chief Election Commissioner of India
Metbah Lyngdoh, United Democratic Party politician from Meghalaya, India
Paul Lyngdoh, Indian politician and poet who was born in Shillong, Meghalaya, India
Rowell Lyngdoh, Indian politician from the state of Meghalaya, India
Shaisngi Lyngdoh (born 1988), Indian cricketer
Victor Lyngdoh, since 2020, the Metropolitan Archbishop of the Roman Catholic Archdiocese of Shillong, Meghalaya, India